Natural World is a strand of British wildlife documentary programmes broadcast on BBC Two and BBC Two HD and regarded by the BBC as its flagship natural history series. It is the longest-running documentary in its genre on British television, with nearly 500 episodes broadcast since its inception in 1983. Natural World programmes are typically one-off films that take an in-depth look at particular natural history events, stories or subjects from around the globe.

Natural World was produced by the BBC Natural History Unit in Bristol under the stewardship of the series editor, who was responsible for commissioning or acquiring content. Programmes are a mixture of in-house productions, collaborative productions with other broadcasters or acquisitions from independent producers. There was 10 programmes broadcast each year, of which approximately half are produced in-house. The series has close ties with the US series Nature, broadcast by PBS.

The last episode was broadcast on 20 March 2020 with no new upcoming episodes currently listed.

History
Natural World was initiated in 1983 as a wildlife-specific spin-off to The World About Us, itself a long-running documentary strand on BBC Two. The World About Us was commissioned in 1967 by David Attenborough, at that time the Controller of BBC Two, to promote the new colour television service to British audiences. As the former head of the BBC's Travel and Exploration Unit in London, Attenborough realised that many of its telecine films had been shot in colour and would make ideal subjects for a documentary series, along with natural history content from the Bristol Unit and overseas broadcasters. The World About Us launched on 3 December 1967 to coincide with the first full evening of colour television in Britain, with Attenborough himself acting as series editor. The first programme was "Volcano", a film by the French vulcanologist Haroun Tazieff; the Natural History Unit's first contribution was "Forest and Firebird" featuring the brilliantly coloured scarlet ibis. Programmes such as these were no accident: The World About Us was described by Barry Paine, a frequent producer and narrator during its first two decades, as "a series designed to sell colour television sets".

Due to the difficulty of sourcing colour films at the time, The World About Us started out with a broad remit of geography, anthropology and natural history as subject matter. Gradually, the contributions from the Travel and Exploration Unit diminished and the Natural History Unit's programmes grew in prominence. This was acknowledged by the BBC when the series was re-launched as The Natural World in 1983; the title subsequently shortened to its current form in 2003. The first episode under the new title was "Save the Panda", broadcast on 30 October 1983 in what would become a regular time slot on Sunday evenings (where series editor Peter Jones claimed audiences were "hungry for natural history"). The World About Us continued until 1986.

The early series editors benefited from a generous budget, courtesy of a co-production partnership with the US broadcaster WNET. The American channel was keen to commission material for its recently launched Nature strand on PBS. The first programme to benefit from the partnership was the 1982 mini-series The Flight of the Condor. At the same time, researchers and field biologists were publishing many new discoveries about wildlife in scientific journals, providing the BBC with plentiful material for new programme ideas. As a result, the strand quickly expanded from 10 to 20 slots by 1985 and a number of special programmes were commissioned, helped by additional funding from BBC Enterprises (now BBC Worldwide). Among them were the award-winning mini-series Kingdom of the Ice Bear (1985) and Vanishing Earth (1986).

David Attenborough maintained a close association with Natural World throughout its long history, narrating or presenting around 50 episodes to date. In 2008, on the strand's 25th anniversary, he commented "I have no doubt that Natural World is not only the doyen and founding member of the 50-minute natural history genre but is still the one with the best and most distinguished record."

In 2010s, the number of Natural World programmes reduced to 10 per series, and the strand no longer occupied a regular place in BBC Two's schedule. High-definition broadcasts of Natural World programmes started in 2008 on the BBC HD channel and following its closure are now simulcast on BBC Two HD.

Format, content and notable episodes

The World About Us helped to popularize the long-form documentary on British television thanks to its generous 50-minute length, a step up from the half-hour programmes which were more common at the time. Filmmakers were able to take advantage of this format to delve into a particular story in more detail, or cover broader themes. More recently, the running time has been extended to 60 minutes.

The tone of the strand was set by its first series editor, Peter Jones, who gave his film-makers the time and budget to explore their subjects in more detail. He also decided to avoid a house style in favour of a flexible approach where the style was chosen to match the subject of the documentary. This freedom from stylistic constraints gave film-makers autonomy to make the programmes they wanted. As Natural World quickly established itself in the schedules, the series editors were able to take risks with unusual subjects which may otherwise have been avoided by broadcasters. According to Jones, "the idea was to give the audience a surprise each week. It was as far from the contemporary concept of formatted television as you could get." Some of the more unusual subjects have included plankton, wasps, cephalopods and manure ("The Wonderful World of Dung", 1991).

Jones's successors have maintained the same ethos, mixing traditional "blue-chip" natural history with different approaches to storytelling. Mike Gunton, series editor from 2001 to 2004, introduced more human elements into the programmes, granted filmmakers additional time in the field to get the shots they needed and continued to experiment with style. "Cats Under Serengeti Stars" was filmed entirely in black and white and "Dune" was told from the point of view of a grain of sand.

In its current guise, Natural World programmes typically fall into three categories: strong, emotional stories; popular or unusual but interesting animal subjects; and films offering a different, personal perspective. Filmmakers are granted up to 100 days in the field, depending on how much archive material can be used.

David Attenborough's notable episodes include the Echo of the Elephants films, which followed scientist Cynthia Moss and cameraman Martyn Colbeck on their lengthy study of an elephant herd in Kenya. In "Attenborough in Paradise" (1996), he fulfilled a lifelong ambition to observe and film the courtship displays of birds of paradise, whilst "The Amber Time Machine" (2004) saw him trace the origins of a piece of amber from the time of the dinosaurs. For "Attenborough's Ark", a 2012 special, he selected his 10 personal favourite species to save on an imaginary ark. The programme drew 3.2 million viewers, the strand's highest audience for eight years. Natural World'''s most-watched episode also featured Attenborough, this time as the narrator of "Highgrove, A Prince's Legacy" (2003). 4.8 million viewers watched Prince Charles explain the organic farming methods used on his Highgrove House estate.

For many years, the series regularly included documentaries on British wildlife, but the commissioning editors no longer consider such programmes. The last programme with a British theme was "An Unnatural History of London" in 2012, which featured the capital's urban wildlife. Another programme set in Britain, 2003's "My Halcyon River", became the most requested repeat by readers of Radio Times in the days following its transmission.

AwardsNatural World programmes were regularly nominated at television industry awards and wildlife film festivals. Notable award-winners from the early years of the series include the 1986 Prix Italia for Vanishing Earth and an Emmy for cinematography for Kingdom of the Ice Bear. The Royal Television Society awarded Natural World the Best Documentary Strand in 1999 and photography prizes to the episodes "Mississippi, Tales of the Last River Rat" in 2005 and "Wye, Voices from the Valley" in 2007. "Mississippi, Tales of the Last River Rat" was also recognised at the Grierson Trust's British Documentary Awards in 2005.

Other later award-winning episodes include "A Tiger Called Broken Tail", overall winner at the Jackson Hole Wildlife Film Festival in 2011 and Missoula's International Wildlife Film Festival (IWFF) in 2012, "Madagascar, Lemurs and Spies", a three-time winner at IWFF in 2012, "My Life As A Turkey", recipient of the Golden Panda at the Wildscreen Festival in 2012 and "Kangaroo Dundee", a prize-winner at Jackson Hole and IWFF in 2013.

Series editors

 Peter Jones (1983–1987) (also series editor of The World About Us'' 1979–1983)
 Andrew Neal (1987–1989)
 Mike Salisbury (1989–1993)
 John Sparks (1993–1997)
 Neil Nightingale (1997–2001)
 Mike Gunton (2001–2004)
 Tim Martin (2004–2011)
 Steve Greenwood (2011–2013)
 Roger Webb (2013–2020)

References

External links
 
 

1983 British television series debuts
2020 British television series endings
1980s British documentary television series
1990s British documentary television series
2000s British documentary television series
2010s British documentary television series
2020s British documentary television series
BBC high definition shows
BBC television documentaries
English-language television shows
Documentary films about nature
Television series by BBC Studios